Antonio Munguía Flores (June 27, 1942 – January 8, 2018) was a Mexican football midfielder, who played for the Mexico national team between 1967 and 1971, gaining 44 caps. He was part of the Mexico squad for the 1970 World Cup.

References

External links
 
 

1942 births
2018 deaths
Footballers from Mexico City
Association football midfielders
Mexico international footballers
1970 FIFA World Cup players
Club Necaxa footballers
Cruz Azul footballers
Liga MX players
Mexican footballers